Francis Carmont (born October 10, 1981) is a French professional mixed martial artist who last competed in the Light Heavyweight division. A professional competitor since 2004, Carmont has competed for Bellator MMA, the UFC, and KSW.

Mixed martial arts career

Early career
Carmont made his professional MMA debut February 2004.  He amassed a record of 16 wins and 7 losses before making his UFC debut.

Ultimate Fighting Championship
Carmont signed with the UFC and made his debut at UFC 137 against Chris Camozzi, winning via unanimous decision.

Carmont won via submission over promotional newcomer Magnus Cedenblad on April 14, 2012 at UFC on Fuel TV 2.

Carmont next faced Karlos Vemola on July 11, 2012 at UFC on Fuel TV: Munoz vs. Weidman. He won the fight via submission in the second round.

Carmont defeated Tom Lawlor on November 17, 2012 at UFC 154 via controversial split decision.

Carmont defeated Lorenz Larkin on April 20, 2013 at UFC on Fox 7 via unanimous decision.  The decision was viewed by many as controversial as most major MMA media outlets scored the bout for his opponent.

Carmont next faced Costas Philippou on September 21, 2013 at UFC 165.  Carmont won the fight via unanimous decision, taking Philippou down in each round and controlling him on the ground.

Carmont faced Ronaldo Souza on February 15, 2014 at UFC Fight Night 36. He lost the fight via unanimous decision.

Carmont faced CB Dollaway on May 31, 2014 at UFC Fight Night 41. He lost the fight by unanimous decision.

Carmont faced Thales Leites on August 23, 2014 at UFC Fight Night 49. Carmont lost the fight via second-round KO, dropping his third straight fight and was subsequently released from the promotion.

Bellator MMA
In December 2014, it was announced that Carmont has signed with Bellator MMA.

Carmont made his debut by returning to the Light Heavyweight division against Guilherme Viana at Bellator 135 on March 27, 2015 in his Bellator debut. He won the back-and-forth fight via unanimous decision.

Carmont was next a participant in Bellator's one-night Light Heavyweight tournament at Bellator MMA & Glory: Dynamite 1 on September 19, 2015.  He faced Anthony Ruiz in the Alternate bout and won by unanimous decision.  Due to Muhammed Lawal being unable to participate in the final due to injury, Carmont faced Phil Davis in the tournament finals.  He lost the fight via knockout in the first round.

Carmont was supposed to fight Linton Vassell at Bellator 158 but a cut over Vassell's left eye forced him to withdraw. Carmont instead faced Lukasz Klinger and won via submission in the first round.

The bout against Vassell was re-booked for Bellator 165 on November 19, 2016. Carmont lost the fight by unanimous decision.

On February 20, 2018 it was announced that Bellator had released Carmont from the promotion.

Mixed martial arts record

|-
|Loss
|align=center| 25–12
|Linton Vassell
| Decision (unanimous)
|Bellator 165
|
|align=center|3
|align=center|5:00
|San Jose, California, United States
|
|-
| Win
| align=center| 25–11
| Lukasz Klinger
| Submission (D'Arce choke)
| Bellator 158
| 
| align=center| 1
| align=center| 3:54
| London, England, United Kingdom
| 
|-
| Loss
| align=center| 24–11
| Phil Davis
| KO (punches)
| rowspan=2| Bellator 142: Dynamite 1
| rowspan=2| 
| align=center| 1
| align=center| 2:15
| rowspan=2| San Jose, California, United States
| 
|-
| Win
| align=center| 24–10
| Anthony Ruiz
| Decision (unanimous)
| align=center| 2
| align=center| 5:00
| 
|-
| Win
| align=center| 23–10
| Guilherme Viana
| Decision (unanimous)
| Bellator 135
| 
| align=center| 3
| align=center| 5:00
| Thackerville, Oklahoma, United States
| 
|-
| Loss
| align=center| 22–10
| Thales Leites
| KO (punches)
| UFC Fight Night: Henderson vs. dos Anjos
| 
| align=center| 2
| align=center| 0:20
| Tulsa, Oklahoma, United States
| 
|-
| Loss
| align=center| 22–9
| C. B. Dollaway
| Decision (unanimous)
| UFC Fight Night: Muñoz vs. Mousasi
| 
| align=center| 3
| align=center| 5:00
| Berlin, Germany
| 
|-
| Loss
| align=center| 22–8
| Ronaldo Souza
| Decision (unanimous)
| UFC Fight Night: Machida vs. Mousasi
| 
| align=center| 3
| align=center| 5:00
| Jaraguá do Sul, Brazil
| 
|-
| Win
| align=center| 22–7
| Costas Philippou
| Decision (unanimous)
| UFC 165
| 
| align=center| 3
| align=center| 5:00
| Toronto, Ontario, Canada
| 
|-
| Win
| align=center| 21–7
| Lorenz Larkin
| Decision (unanimous)
| UFC on Fox: Henderson vs. Melendez
| 
| align=center| 3
| align=center| 5:00
| San Jose, California, United States
| 
|-
| Win
| align=center| 20–7
| Tom Lawlor
| Decision (split)
| UFC 154
| 
| align=center| 3
| align=center| 5:00
| Montreal, Quebec, Canada
| 
|-
| Win
| align=center| 19–7
| Karlos Vémola
| Submission (rear-naked choke)
| UFC on Fuel TV: Muñoz vs. Weidman
| 
| align=center| 2
| align=center| 1:39
| San Jose, California, United States
| 
|-
| Win
| align=center| 18–7
| Magnus Cedenblad
| Submission (rear-naked choke)
| UFC on Fuel TV: Gustafsson vs. Silva
| 
| align=center| 2
| align=center| 1:42
| Stockholm, Sweden
| 
|-
| Win
| align=center| 17–7
| Chris Camozzi
| Decision (unanimous) 
| UFC 137
| 
| align=center| 3
| align=center| 5:00
| Las Vegas, Nevada, United States
| 
|-
| Win
| align=center| 16–7
| Jason Day
| TKO (punches)
| Slammer in the Hammer
| 
| align=center| 1
| align=center| 2:10
| Hamilton, Ontario, Canada
| 
|-
| Win
| align=center| 15–7
| Kelly Anundson	
| Submission (armbar)
| SHC 4: Monson vs. Perak
| 
| align=center| 1
| align=center| 2:06
| Geneva, Switzerland 
| 
|-
| Win
| align=center| 14–7
| Simon Carlsen
| TKO (punches)	
| Heroes Gate 3	
| 
| align=center| 2
| align=center| 2:43
| Prague, Czech Republic
| 
|-
| Win
| align=center| 13–7
| Emil Zahariev	
| Submission (kimura)	
| SHC 3: Carmont vs. Zahariev	
| 
| align=center| 2	
| align=center| 1:31
| Geneva, Switzerland
| 
|-
| Win
| align=center| 12–7
| Lukasz Jurkowski
| Submission (rear-naked choke)
| KSW Extra
| 
| align=center| 	1
| align=center| 	4:14
| Warsaw, Poland
| 
|-
| Loss
| align=center| 11–7
| Baga Agaev
| Submission (armbar)
| FightFORCE: Russia vs. The World
| 
| align=center| 1
| align=center| 4:59
| Moscow, Russia
| 
|-
| Win
| align=center| 11–6
| Gerald Burton-Batty
| TKO (punches)
| Cage Fighting Championships 3
| 
| align=center| 1	
| align=center| 1:53
| Sydney, Australia
| 
|-
| Loss
| align=center| 10–6
| Karol Bedorf
| Decision (unanimous)
| KSW 8: Konfrontacja
| 
| align=center| 	3	
| align=center| 3:00
| Warsaw, Poland
| 
|-
| Win
| align=center| 10–5
| Todd Broadaway
| TKO (punches)
| BodogFIGHT: Costa Rica Combat
| 
| align=center| 1	
| align=center| 3:12
| San José, Costa Rica
| 
|-
| Loss
| align=center| 9–5
| Vitor Vianna
| Decision (unanimous)
| Kam Lung: Only the Strongest Survive 5
| 
| align=center| 2	
| align=center| 5:00
| Amsterdam, Netherlands
| 
|-
| Win
| align=center| 9–4
| Robert Jocz
| Decision (unanimous)
| KSW V: Konfrontacja
| 
| align=center| 2
| align=center| 5:00
| Warsaw, Poland
| 
|-
| Win
| align=center| 8–4
| Piotr Baginski	
| TKO (knee and punches)	
| KSW V: Konfrontacja
| 
| align=center| 1
| align=center| 4:35
| Warsaw, Poland
| 
|-
| Win
| align=center| 7–4
| Goce Candovski
| Decision (unanimous)
| KSW V: Konfrontacja
| 
| align=center| 2
| align=center| 5:00
| Warsaw, Poland
| 
|-
| Loss
| align=center| 6–4
| Evangelista Santos	
| Decision (majority)	
| WFC: Europe vs. Brazil	
| 
| align=center| 3	
| align=center| 5:00
| Koper, Slovenia
| 
|-
| Win
| align=center| 6–3
| Bastien Huveneers	
| Submission (Achilles lock)	
| Defi des Champions	
| 
| align=center| 2
| align=center| 3:51
| Tunis, Tunisia
| 
|-
| Win
| align=center| 5–3
| Ali Allouane	
| Submission (kimura)	
| Xtreme Gladiators 2	
| 
| align=center| 1
| align=center| 1:52	
| Paris, France
| 
|-
| Win
| align=center| 4–3
| Al Musa	
| TKO (punches)	
| Extreme Fighting 1	
| 
| align=center| 1
| align=center| 2:24
| London, England
| 
|-
| Loss
| align=center| 3–3
| Grzegorz Jakubowski	
| Submission (guillotine choke)	
| European Vale Tudo 5: Phoenix	
| 
| align=center| 1
| align=center| 1:52
| Stockholm, Sweden
| 
|-
| Loss
| align=center| 3–2
| Ross Pointon
| TKO (doctor stoppage)	
| UK MMA Championship 9: Smackdown 	
| 
| align=center| 1
| align=center| 1:13
| Essex, England
| 
|-
| Loss
| align=center| 3–1
| Daniel Burzotta	
| Submission (guillotine choke)	
| UK MMA Championship 7: Rage & Fury 
| 
| align=center| 1
| align=center| 3:39
| Essex, England
| 
|-
| Win
| align=center| 3–0
| Slavomir Molnar	
| Submission (triangle choke)	
| TotalFight 3	
| 
| align=center| 2
| align=center| 4:05
| Budapest, Hungary
| 
|-
| Win
| align=center| 2–0
| Roy Rutten	
| Submission (armbar)	
| Kam Lung: Day of the Truth 5	
| 
| align=center| 1
| align=center| 1:19
| Rhoon, Netherlands
| 
|-
| Win
| align=center| 1–0
| Kuljit Degun	
| Submission (armbar)	
| UK MMA Championship 6: Extreme Warriors 
| 
| align=center| 1
| align=center| 3:41
| Essex, England
|

See also
 List of Bellator MMA alumni

References

External links
 
 
 Official Site

1981 births
Living people
People from Saint-Tropez
French mixed martial artists of Black African descent
Mixed martial artists utilizing savate
Mixed martial artists utilizing Muay Thai
French practitioners of Brazilian jiu-jitsu
French Muay Thai practitioners
French savateurs
Sportspeople from Var (department)
Ultimate Fighting Championship male fighters
Mixed martial artists utilizing Brazilian jiu-jitsu